is a Japanese manga series written and illustrated by Tsukasa Hojo. The series was adapted into an anime series produced by Sunrise, directed by Kenji Kodama and broadcast by Yomiuri Television. City Hunter 2 was broadcast for 63 episodes between April 8 and July 14. It was released on 10 VHS between August 1988 and March 1990. The opening themes were "Angel Night" by Psy-S for the first 26 episodes and "Sara" by Fence of Defence for the remaining episodes. The ending themes were "Super Girl" by Yasuyuki Okamura for the first 37 episodes and "Still Love Her" by TM Network for the remaining episodes.

A Thirty-Two disc DVD boxset City Hunter Complete published by Aniplex was released in Japan on August 31, 2005. The set contained all four series, the TV specials and animated movies as well as an art book and figures of Ryo and Kaori. City Hunter 2 was then released on 11 individual discs between March 26 and June 25, 2008.

ADV Films released the series on DVD in North America. City Hunter 2 was released as two boxsets of five discs on October 28 and November 18, 2003.

Episode list

References

2